Life insurance is one of the growing sectors in India since 2000 as Government allowed Private players and FDI up to 26%  and recently Cabinet approved a proposal to increase it to 49%. In 1955, mean risk per policy of Indian and foreign life insurers amounted respectively to ₹2,950 & ₹7,859 (worth ₹15 lakh & ₹41 lakh in 2017 prices). Life Insurance in India was nationalised by incorporating Life Insurance Corporation (LIC) in 1956. All private life insurance companies at that time were taken over by LIC. In 1993, the Government of India appointed RN Malhotra Committee to lay down a road map for privatisation of the life insurance sector.

Types of life insurance in India
Unit-linked insurance plan

Companies 
Below are the list of life insurance companies in India:

 Life Insurance Corporation of India
 HDFC Life
 ICICI Prudential Life Insurance 
 Bajaj Allianz Life Insurance
 Kotak Life Insurance
 SBI Life Insurance Company
 Max Life Insurance
 Exide Life Insurance
 Reliance Life Insurance
 IDBI Federal Life Insurance
 IndiaFirst Life Insurance Company
 Canara HSBC Oriental Bank of Commerce Life Insurance
 Aviva India
 Aegon Life Insurance Company
 PNB MetLife India Insurance Company
 Bharti AXA Life Insurance Co. Ltd.
 Birla Sun Life Insurance Co. Ltd.
 DHFL Pramerica Life Insurance Co. Ltd.
 Edelweiss Tokio Life Insurance Co. Ltd
 Future Generali India Life Insurance Co. Ltd.
 Sahara India Life Insurance Co. Ltd.
 Shriram Life Insurance Co. Ltd.
 Star Union Dai-Ichi Life Insurance Co. Ltd.
 Tata AIA Life Insurance Co. Ltd.

References